A. R. Johnson was an American politician who served in the Louisiana Senate from 1916 to 1924.

References

1856 births
1933 deaths
People from Dadeville, Alabama
Baptists from Louisiana
Democratic Party Louisiana state senators
American merchants
American bankers
American male journalists
Mayors of places in Arkansas
Mayors of places in Louisiana
School board members in Louisiana
People from Homer, Louisiana
People from Natchitoches Parish, Louisiana
People from Ashland, Wisconsin
People from Scott County, Mississippi
People from Columbia County, Arkansas
Journalists from Alabama
Baptists from Mississippi
Baptists from Alabama
Baptists from Arkansas